The 2003 FIA Formula One World Championship was the 57th season of FIA Formula One motor racing. It began on 9 March 2003 and ended on 12 October after sixteen races. World Championship titles were awarded for both drivers and constructors with Michael Schumacher winning the former and Ferrari awarded the latter.

The 2003 season saw the introduction of new regulations intended to increase F1's excitement, stem falling global TV audiences and to help alleviate the financial difficulties of the smaller teams.  One-lap qualifying was introduced as a way for smaller teams to get more television exposure. Optional Friday testing at Grand Prix events was introduced in exchange for fewer miles on stand-alone test days. This was intended to give smaller teams a cheaper alternative to these test days, which were to be banned in 2004. Only one type of wet weather tyre was allowed to be used in wet weather races. The points system for both the Constructors' and Drivers' titles was changed from 10–6–4–3–2–1 for the first six finishers at each round to 10–8–6–5–4–3–2–1 for the first eight finishers in an attempt to make the title contests closer.

While Ferrari's Michael Schumacher had won the 2002 championship by 67 points from his teammate Rubens Barrichello, the 2003 season was much closer. For a great part of the 2003 season, several drivers from several teams had mathematical chances of winning the world championship. Eight different drivers won a Grand Prix, amongst them three first time winners. Kimi Räikkönen, driving for McLaren-Mercedes, and Juan Pablo Montoya, driving for BMW Williams, both had a chance of claiming the 2003 championship until late in the season, with Räikkönen still mathematically in contention at the final race, the Japanese Grand Prix. Räikkönen lost the championship to Schumacher by two points, although he won only one race to Schumacher's six. It was Schumacher's sixth World Drivers' title overall, breaking Juan Manuel Fangio's 46-year-old record of five World Drivers' titles. Ferrari's defence of the Constructors' title was challenged throughout the year by Williams and McLaren, one of the few seasons where there were three front-running teams but in the end, Ferrari emerged victorious once again and the team clinched their fifth consecutive World Constructors' title since 1999.

Notable races include the chaotic Brazilian Grand Prix which was hampered by monsoon conditions and resulted in the wet weather tyre rule being reversed after just three races, and the British Grand Prix where the track was invaded by the now-defrocked priest Neil Horan, who ran onto the Hangar straight, running towards the 250 km/h train of cars, wearing a green kilt and waving religious banners.

After failing to complete the 2002 season due to financial difficulties, the Arrows team had their application for admission to the 2003 championship rejected by the FIA prior to the season start date. No reason was publicly given by the FIA and Arrows subsequently folded after 25 years in Formula One since 1978.

2003 also saw a major leap forward in Formula One safety, with the HANS device being made a mandatory requirement for drivers to wear at all races beginning from the Australian Grand Prix onwards. However, this was not without controversy, as many drivers voiced their complaints about the device, including Barrichello, Jacques Villeneuve, Justin Wilson and Nick Heidfeld.

Both electronic driver aids had been used since the 2001 Spanish Grand Prix, and a rule-change in the technical regulations saw the FIA banning both systems for 2004.

Teams and drivers
The following teams and drivers competed in the 2003 FIA Formula One World Championship.

† All engines were required to have ten cylinders and an engine capacity not exceeding 3000 cc, and all were of V10 configuration.

Free practice drivers
Three constructors entered free practice only drivers over the course of the season.

Team changes
 The Arrows team folded several days after the 2002 German Grand Prix due to financial issues without contesting another Grand Prix.
 Jordan switched to Ford engines for 2003, after their previous suppliers, Honda, opted to focus on their partnership with BAR. Jordan's contract with the Japanese engine manufacturer was due to expire at the end of the 2003 season, but Honda were no longer willing to provide Jordan with free engines. A link-up with, and possible buy-out by, Asiatech was rumoured, although this did not prove to be the case, and, when funding was withdrawn from the company, Asiatech was wound down. Minardi, who had been using Asiatech engines in 2002, switched to Cosworth units for 2003.
 Renault took part in Friday testing sessions. People thought it was odd because not only were they a manufacturer, they would also get fewer testing miles. However, Mike Gascoyne, the technical director for Renault in 2003, said that not only did Renault save money, they also got more testing mileage out of their cars.

Driver changes
 Fernando Alonso, the team's test driver in 2002, was promoted to a full-time drive at Renault, replacing Jenson Button. Button moved to BAR, where he took the seat vacated by the Toyota-bound Olivier Panis. Panis joined Formula One debutant, and reigning CART champion, Cristiano da Matta at the Japanese team, in an all-new lineup for 2003. Allan McNish, one of the drivers replaced at Toyota, signed with Renault as a test driver, while his teammate from 2002, Mika Salo, left Formula One altogether.
 Felipe Massa left his Sauber drive to assume the duties of test driver for Ferrari. His place at Sauber was taken by Heinz-Harald Frentzen, who had replaced Massa on a one-off basis for the United States Grand Prix (by which time Frentzen was already confirmed as a Sauber driver for 2003), after having driven for Arrows before the team's collapse.
 Takuma Sato left the Jordan team to take the place of several others (Anthony Davidson, Darren Manning, Ryo Fukuda and Patrick Lemarié) as the sole test driver for BAR, being replaced by 2002 Formula Nippon champion Ralph Firman.
 Jaguar replaced both Eddie Irvine and Pedro de la Rosa for 2003. Their new drivers were Mark Webber, who signed from Minardi, and debutant Antônio Pizzonia, who drove in the International Formula 3000 series in 2002 whilst also performing test driver duties for Williams. Webber's vacated seat at Minardi was filled by Justin Wilson, who had won the International Formula 3000 title in 2001. Alex Yoong's Minardi contract from 2002 was not renewed and he moved to the CART series, albeit only for a brief stint, in 2003. He was replaced at Minardi by Jos Verstappen, who had spent a season on the sidelines after losing his Arrows drive to Heinz-Harald Frentzen in 2002.

Mid-season changes
 Minardi's Justin Wilson joined Jaguar from the German Grand Prix onwards, filling in for the under-performing Antônio Pizzonia, who was offered a test driving role at the team but turned it down. He would later resurface as a test driver at Williams. Wilson's seat at Minardi was taken by the Danish driver Nicolas Kiesa, who joined Formula One from the International Formula 3000 series.
 Ralph Firman suffered injuries as a result of a crash during practice in Hungary. He was replaced by Zsolt Baumgartner for two races before returning to finish the season for Jordan. Baumgartner, another driver who had been competing in the International Formula 3000 series, was the first Hungarian driver to race in Formula One.
 Ralf Schumacher was unable to race in Italy, due to concussion. He was replaced at Williams by Marc Gené, the team's test driver, for that particular race, before returning for the following Grand Prix.
 After a string of disappointing results in 2003, Jacques Villeneuve elected to end his season one race early, and was replaced at BAR by test driver Takuma Sato for the Japanese Grand Prix. Villeneuve would later drive for Renault in 2004 as a replacement driver, and sign a multi-year contract at Sauber for 2005 (though he was replaced in 2006).

Season calendar
The 2003 FIA Formula One World Championship was contested over the following sixteen races:
{|class="wikitable" width=650px style="font-size: 85%;"
|-
! Round
! Grand Prix
! Circuit
! Date
|-
!1
| Australian Grand Prix
|  Melbourne Grand Prix Circuit, Melbourne
| 9 March
|-
!2
| Malaysian Grand Prix
|  Sepang International Circuit, Kuala Lumpur
| 23 March
|-
!3
| Brazilian Grand Prix
|  Autódromo José Carlos Pace, São Paulo
| 6 April
|-
!4
| San Marino Grand Prix
|  Autodromo Enzo e Dino Ferrari, Imola
| 20 April
|-
!5
| Spanish Grand Prix
|  Circuit de Catalunya, Montmeló
| 4 May
|-
!6
| Austrian Grand Prix
|  A1-Ring, Spielberg
| 18 May
|-
!7
| Monaco Grand Prix
|  Circuit de Monaco, Monte Carlo
| 1 June
|-
!8
| Canadian Grand Prix
|  Circuit Gilles Villeneuve, Montreal
| 15 June
|-
!9
| European Grand Prix
|  Nürburgring, Nürburg
| 29 June
|-
!10
| French Grand Prix
|  Circuit de Nevers Magny-Cours, Magny-Cours
| 6 July
|-
!11
| British Grand Prix
|  Silverstone Circuit, Silverstone
| 20 July
|-
!12
| German Grand Prix
|  Hockenheimring, Hockenheim
| 3 August
|-
!13
| Hungarian Grand Prix
|  Hungaroring, Mogyoród
| 24 August
|-
!14
| Italian Grand Prix
|  Autodromo Nazionale di Monza, Monza
| 14 September
|-
!15
| United States Grand Prix
|  Indianapolis Motor Speedway, Speedway
| 28 September
|-
!16
| Japanese Grand Prix
|  Suzuka Circuit, Suzuka
| 12 October
|-
| colspan="4" style="background-color:#EAECF0;text-align:center" align="bottom" |Sources:|}
The Belgian Grand Prix scheduled for 31 August was cancelled due to a row over tobacco advertising. 

Results and standings

Grands Prix

Scoring system

Points were awarded to the top eight finishing drivers and constructors as follows:

World Drivers' Championship standingsNotes: – Driver did not finish the Grand Prix but was classified, as he completed more than 90% of the race distance.

World Constructors' Championship standingsNotes:'''
 – Driver did not finish the Grand Prix but was classified, as he completed more than 90% of the race distance.

Notes

References

External links

formula1.com – 2003 drivers standings (archived)
formula1.com – 2003 teams standings (archived)

Formula One seasons
 
Formula 1